José Rodríguez y Díaz de Lecea (2 May 1894 – 28 November 1967) was a Spanish general who served as Minister of the Air of Spain between 1957 and 1962, during the Francoist dictatorship.

References

1894 births
1967 deaths
Defence ministers of Spain
Government ministers during the Francoist dictatorship